Luka Belić (born 14 October 1988) is a former professional tennis player from Croatia, who played mainly on the ATP Challenger Tour and ITF Futures.

He reached his career-high singles ranking of World No. 620 on May 18, 2009.

In 2006 ATP Umag he lost the 1st round match to future world number one tennis player Novak Djokovic 3–6, 3–6.

References

External links
 
 

Croatian male tennis players
People from Umag
1988 births
Living people